The Royal Aero Club issued Aviators Certificates from 1910. These were internationally recognised under the Fédération Aéronautique Internationale.

List

Legend

See also
Lists for other years:
1910
1911
1912
1913
1914
List of pilots with foreign Aviator's Certificates accredited by the Royal Aero Club 1910-1914

References

Bibliography
 

Aviation pioneers
Lists of aviators
1910 in aviation
Aviat
1910-related lists
1910 in the United Kingdom